This is a list of notable events in music that took place in 1555.

Events 
January 17 – Italian viol player and composer Peter Lupo joins the musicians' guild in London.
Palestrina succeeds Orlande de Lassus as maestro di cappella of the Basilica of Saint John Lateran in Rome.
Composer Thomas Whythorne returns to England from travels in Italy and the rest of Europe. The book he writes about his travels is now lost.
Lorenzo de' Medici orders a violin from Andrea Amati of Cremona.

Music 
Hermann Finck – Two wedding motets:
, for five voices
, for four voices

Publications 
Jacquet de Berchem – First book of madrigals for four voices (Venice: Girolamo Scotto)
Pierre Cadéac – First book of motets for four, five, and six voices (Paris: Le Roy & Ballard)
Pierre Certon – 50 Psalms for four voices (Paris: Le Roy & Ballard)
Jhan Gero – Two books of motets (Venice: Girolamo Scotto)
Claude Gervaise, ed. – Sixth book of dances for four instruments (Paris: Pierre Attaignant's widow)
Claude Goudimel – Second book of psalms for four, five, and six voices (Paris)
Francisco Guerrero – Motets for four and five voices (Seville: Martin de Montesdoca)
Clément Janequin
Orlande de Lassus
Fourth book for four voices (Antwerp: Tielman Susato), contains chansons, madrigals, villanelle, and motets, published in Italian and French
First book of madrigals for five voices (Venice: Antonio Gardano)
Jean de Latre – Sixth book of chansons for four voices (Leuven: Pierre Phalèse)
Jean l'Héritier –  for four voices (Venice: Girolamo Scotto)
Vicente Lusitano – First book of motets for five, six, and eight voices (Rome: Valerio & Luigi Dorico)
Jean Maillard – First book of motets for four, five, and six voices (Paris: Le Roy & Ballard)
Giovanni Pierluigi da Palestrina – First book of secular madrigals for four voices
Martin Peudargent
First book of motets for five voices (Dusseldorf: Jacob Bathenius)
Second book of motets for five voices (Dusseldorf: Jacob Bathenius for Arnold Birckmann)
Dominique Phinot – First book of psalms for four voices (Venice: Antonio Gardano)
Costanzo Porta
First book of madrigals for four voices (Venice: Antonio Gardano)
First book of motets for five voices (Venice: Antonio Gardano)
Nicola Vicentino –  ("Ancient Music Adapted to Modern Practice"), a treatise aimed at revising the chromatic and enharmonic genera of the ancient Greeks.
Adrian Willaert – ' (Venice: Antonio Gardano), the first printed collection by a single composer of complete polyphonic office settings

Births 
February 25 – Alonso Lobo, Spanish composer (died 1617)
June 11 – Lodovico Zacconi, composer and music theorist (died 1627)
probable – Paolo Quagliati, composer of the Roman school (died 1628)

Deaths 
date unknown – Mads Hak, Danish composer
probable – Jacob Clemens non Papa, Flemish composer (born c. 1510)

References

 
Music
16th century in music
Music by year